Return of the Lash is a 1947 American Western film directed by Ray Taylor and written by Joseph O'Donnell. The film stars Lash LaRue, Al St. John, Mary Maynard, Buster Slaven, George Chesebro and Lee Morgan. The film was released on October 11, 1947, by Producers Releasing Corporation.

Plot

Cast          
Lash LaRue as Cheyenne Davis
Al St. John as Fuzzy Q. Jones 
Mary Maynard as Kay Grant
Buster Slaven as Tom Grant 
George Chesebro as Big Jim Kirby
Lee Morgan as Dan Clark
Lane Bradford as Dave
Curley Gibson as Pete 
Dee Cooper as Hank
Roy Butler as Sheriff
George DeNormand as Jeff Harper
Carl Mathews as Charlie
Slim Whitaker as Bert

References

External links
 

1947 films
American Western (genre) films
1947 Western (genre) films
Producers Releasing Corporation films
Films directed by Ray Taylor
American black-and-white films
1940s English-language films
1940s American films